Mikko Salmio (born July 13, 1991) is a Finnish professional ice hockey player. He is currently playing for Ässät Pori of the Liiga.

Salmio made his SM-liiga debut playing with JYP Jyväskylä during the 2012–13 SM-liiga season.

References

External links

1991 births
Living people
Ässät players
Finnish ice hockey right wingers
JYP-Akatemia players
JYP Jyväskylä players
People from Jämsä
Sportspeople from Central Finland